Plutoniumidae is a family of centipedes belonging to the order Scolopendromorpha. Centipedes in this family are blind and have 21 pairs of legs.

Genera:
 Plutonium Cavanna, 1881
 Theatops Newport, 1844

References

Centipedes